Tosanoides bennetti is a species of reef fish from the subfamily Anthiinae part of the family Serranidae, the groupers and sea basses,  and is known only from the Coral Sea  and can be found in depths of 141–150 meters. Tosanoides bennetti is one of six species that make up the genus Tosanoides.

Etymology
The fish is named honor of Timothy Bennett (b. 1960), an Australian diver and a fish collector for the marine aquarium trade, who captured the type specimen with a handnet.

Description 
It is around 4.9 centimeters long.

References 

Taxa named by Gerald R. Allen
Taxa named by Fenton Walsh
Fish described in 2019
Fish of Australia
Fish of the Pacific Ocean
bennetti